Marina Carr is an Irish playwright who has written almost thirty plays, including By the Bog of Cats (1998).

Early life and education 
Carr was born in Dublin, Ireland, but spent most of her childhood in Pallas Lake, County Offaly, adjacent to the town of Tullamore. Carr's father, Hugh Carr, was a playwright and studied music under Frederick May, while her mother, Maura Eibhlín Breathnach, was the local school's principal and wrote Irish poetry. It was said that "there were a lot of literary rivalries." As a child, Carr and her siblings built a theater in their shed.

Carr attended University College Dublin, studying English and philosophy. She graduated in 1987. In 2011, she received an honorary Doctorate of Literature from her alma mater.

Career 
Carr has held posts as writer-in-residence at the Abbey Theatre and has taught at Trinity College Dublin, Princeton University, and Villanova University. She lectured in the English department at Dublin City University in 2016. Marina Carr is considered one of Ireland's most prominent playwrights and is a member of Aosdána.

Awards 
The Mai won the Dublin Theatre Festival's Best New Irish Play award (1994-1995), and Portia Coughlan won the nineteenth Susan Smith Blackburn Prize (1996-1997). Other awards include The Irish Times Playwright award 1998, the E. M. Forster Award from the American Academy of Arts and Letters and The American Ireland Fund Award, the Macaulay Fellowship, and The Hennessy Award. Carr was named a recipient of the Windham-Campbell Literature Award, administered by the Beinecke Rare Book & Manuscript Library at Yale University. The award, which includes a monetary prize of $165,000 (or €155,000), was formally presented in September 2017. She was the second Irish author to receive the prize, following playwright Abbie Spallen in 2016.

Theatrical works

Publications

 The Mai. London: Dufour Editions, 1995.
 By the Bog of Cats. The Abbey, Dublin, and Wyndham's Theater, London. 1998
 Plays One. London: Faber and Faber, 1999.
On Raftery's Hill. London: Faber and Faber, 2000.
 Ariel. Oldcastle, Co. Meath: Gallery Books, 2002.
 Woman and Scarecrow. London: Faber and Faber, 2006
 Marble. Oldcastle, Co. Meath: Gallery Books, 2009
Plays Two. London: Faber and Faber, 2009
16 Possible Glimpses. The Abbey Theatre, 2011
Plays Three. London: Faber and Faber, 2015
1 in 5. Roe Valley Hospital, 2011

By the Bog of Cats... 
The original production of By the Bog of Cats took place at the Abbey Theatre in Dublin. The play opened on October 7, 1998 and ran until 14 November 1998. The production, totaling 45 performances, was directed by Patrick Mason and designed by Monica Frawley. Other members of the production team included Nick Chelton, lighting designer and Dave Nolan on sound. The lead roles were played by Siobhán Cullen (Josie Kilbride), Olwen Fouéré (Hester Swane), and Conor McDermottroe (Carthage Kilbride). Other characters such as Catwoman were played by Joan O’Hara, Carline Cassidy played by Flonnuala Murphy, and Xavier Cassidy by Tom Hickey.

Irish writer Frank McGuinness wrote the programme note of the Abbey production of By the Bog of Cats... in 1998. His description of the play analyses Carr's style of writing, which he likens to Greek writing:

Woman and Scarecrow

Woman and Scarecrow centers on a dying woman's last stretch of time on earth, reflecting on her life. We are told very little of the setting, but presume she resides in a domestic space, as the stage directions in the first act indicate she is lying in bed 'gaunt and ill'. Apart from the bed, the only furniture indicated is a wardrobe, which has an ominous presence in the play. The mysterious thing that lurks inside the wardrobe signifies death and its imminent approach. For a good part of the play, the only other character present is Scarecrow. It is unclear what Scarecrow represents, perhaps the woman's subconscious. It is significant to note that all of the characters in the play "are referred to by either pronouns or titles - Woman, Him, Scarecrow, Auntie Ah, placing a universal slant on who they are and what they represent." The woman is largely defined in her role as mother and wife throughout the play. She is the mother of eight children, with a ninth having died. As the play progresses, we learn that her husband has been unfaithful. Despite being aware of this, a Woman at times is still dependent on Him, 'I've missed you in bed beside me. On other occasions she redeems herself, asserting her independence by insisting she will not wear her wedding ring to the grave and places value on herself, 'save you were not worthy of my love'. Her independence is consolidated by the fact that she dies when he is absent from the room.  The play runs for approximately 2 hours 20 minutes.

Woman and Scarecrow was staged for the first time at the Royal Court Jerwood Theatre in London in 2006, directed by Ramin Gray and starring Fiona Shaw and Bríd Brennan as Woman and Scarecrow, respectively. Lizzie Clachan designed the set for this production, alongside lighting designer, Mischa Twitchin, and sound designer, Emma Laxton. Later, it was produced in the Peacock Theatre, where it was directed by Selina Cartmell and starred Olwen Fouéré (Woman) and Barbara Brennan (Scarecrow).

The play opened at the Irish Repertory Theatre in New York in May 2018. Directed by Ciarán O'Reilly, the cast included Stephanie Roth Haberle (the woman), Pamela Gray (Scarecrow), Aidan Redmond (the husband), and Dale Soules (the aunt).

The Mai 
The Mai is about a woman in her late 30s, whose husband (and absentee father to their children) returns from having abandoned them, wanted to give their relationship another chance. The play is divided into two acts. The setting for act one is the summer of 1979 (Robert's return from a long time away) and the setting for act two is a year later, as we check in on the state of the precarious relationships established in the first half of the play. Throughout the play, the eponymous The Mai grapples with struggling to keep her marriage alive despite Robert's frequent cheating and conceding to the opinions of her family and leaving him. In the end, she confesses to her daughter Millie, who has served as the narrator of this piece, that she cannot imagine a life without Robert where she would be happy nor a life with him where they could co-exist peaceably together.

The original production of The Mai took place at and was produced by, the Abbey Theatre on 5 October 1994. It was directed by Brian Brady and designed by Kathy Strachan. The lead roles were played by Olwen Fouere (The Mai), Derbhle Crotty (Millie), Joan O'Hara (Grandma Fraochlan) Owen Roe (Robert), Brid Ni Neachtain (Beck), Stella McCusker (Julie), and Maire Hastings (Agnes)

The Mai is thematically in keeping with the main themes of Carr's other work. These characters are all grappling with their roles as mothers and their roles as wives. It is clear that most of them prioritize their husbands over their children and if they didn't, they end up regretting it like Beck, who after pouring herself into her marriage still had to watch it dissolve. Even Grandmother Froachlan, the matriarch of the family says that she would have gladly thrown all of her children into "the slopes of hell" to be reunited with the nine-fingered fisherman. Throughout the play, Carr weaves these characters' relationships in and out of each other to the rhythm of nearby ecology. Millie takes particular interest in the folklore of Owl Lake. In discussing the martial failures alongside the professional triumphs of these women, Carr uses them as vessels to discuss the role of marriage in capitalism and its discriminating patriarchal practices towards unmarried women and single mothers. The Mai is said to have built a sturdy home for her and her children in the years that Robert was gone. This kind of upward mobility is revered by most around her apart from Robert who dismissed her success as having come directly from his generosity. The Mai immediately corrects him reminding him that she was a cellist in the college orchestra and that after he left her to raise their kids alone, she was also teaching full-time. Discourse on marriage and its link to capital are apparent here as the characters talk about how when they lost their husbands, they lost everything, referring to their current socioeconomic status as spinsters.

Marble

Marble opened in Dublin in 2009 at The Abbey Theatre. The four characters are husband and wife Ben and Catherine and a second couple Anne and Art. The play runs for approximately 1 hour 40 minutes.

Translated into Spanish as Mármol the play opened in Madrid in November 2016 at the Teatro Valle-Inclán, home to the National Drama Centre. It was directed by Antonio C. Guijosa and translated into Spanish by Antonio C. Guijosa and Marta I. Moreno. The cast included José Luis Alcobendas (Ben), Elena González (Catherine), Susana Hernández (Anne) and Pepe Viyuela (Art).

References

Further reading
 Allen Randolph, Jody, 'Marina Carr' in Close to the Next Moment: Interviews from a Changing Ireland (Manchester: Carcanet, 2010).
 McMullan, Anna and Cathy Leeney, eds, The Theatre of Marina Carr: Before Rules Was Made (Dublin: Carysfort Press, 2002).
 Trench, Rhona, Bloody Living: The Loss of Selfhood in the Plays of Marina Carr (Bern: Peter Lang, 2010).
 Maleney, Ian. "Marina Carr: ‘How wonderful to burn down the whole world’", The Irish Times, 22 August 2015.

External links
 Gallery Press
 Marina Carr on the Playwrights Database
 Litencyc Com
 Irish Playography Online
 Shop | Abbey Theatre - Amharclann na Mainistreach
Interview with Marina Carr, Ireland's leading female dramatist
The Mai Review the

1964 births
Living people
Aosdána members
People from County Offaly
Alumni of University College Dublin
Irish women dramatists and playwrights
20th-century Irish dramatists and playwrights
21st-century Irish dramatists and playwrights
20th-century Irish women writers
21st-century Irish women writers